Franck Claude Silvestre (born 5 April 1967) is a French former professional footballer who played as a centre back.

During his career, spent in two countries and with six different clubs, he played in more than 700 official games. A French international during three years, Silvestre represented the nation at Euro 1992.

Career
Born in Paris, Silvestre began his professional career at FC Sochaux-Montbéliard in 1985. An undisputed first-choice when he was just 18, he saw the club be relegated into the French second division in 1987, but it immediately gained promotion to the top level, also reaching the French Cup final the next year, lost against FC Metz. The player topped a great 1988 winning the UEFA European Under-21 Football Championship with France U21s.

In 1989 Silvestre, who did not play for a big team, received his first senior callup from national team boss Michel Platini, making his international debut against the Republic of Ireland; he was also selected for UEFA Euro 1992, but remained on the bench as the national side exited on the group stage – he gained a total of 11 caps, the last coming exactly in 1992.

Silvestre signed in the 1993 summer for Guy Roux's AJ Auxerre, making up for William Prunier's departure. During his years in the team, which featured Dutch Frank Verlaat, Laurent Blanc and Frédéric Danjou, he won two domestic cups and one league, including the historic 1995–96 double, also appearing in the UEFA Champions League.

In 1998, Silvestre moved to Montpellier HSC, where he again was an undisputed starter, also eventually becoming team captain. In his third year, he helped the side return to the top division, after netting a career-best nine goals (in 33 matches); eventually, in January 2003, he left for SC Bastia, contributing to a comfortable escape from relegation.

Aged already 36, Silvestre had his first abroad experience, joining SK Sturm Graz in Austria, where he continued to appear regularly, albeit without no silverware conquered. In January 2006, he signed for his last club, second division FC Sète, not managing to help the club maintain its league status, and retiring with a total of 638 league matches played.

Honours
Sochaux
Division 2: 1987–88
Coupe de France runner-up: 1987–88

Auxerre
Division 1: 1995–96
Coupe de France: 1993–94, 1995–96

Montpellier
UEFA Intertoto Cup: 1999

France U21
UEFA European Under-21 Championship: 1988

References

External links
 
 
 AJ Auxerre statistics 
 AJ Auxerre archives 
 

1967 births
Living people
Footballers from Paris
French footballers
Association football defenders
France under-21 international footballers
France international footballers
FC Sochaux-Montbéliard players
AJ Auxerre players
Montpellier HSC players
SC Bastia players
SK Sturm Graz players
FC Sète 34 players
Ligue 1 players
Ligue 2 players
Austrian Football Bundesliga players
UEFA Euro 1992 players
French expatriate footballers
Expatriate footballers in Austria
French expatriate sportspeople in Austria
Black French sportspeople